Sakuichi Fukazawa (4 September 1896 – 12 January 1947) was a Japanese painter and woodblock printer working within the sosaku-hanga "creative prints" movement. 

Fukazawa was born in Niigata Prefecture and moved to Tokyo at a young age, where he attended Tokyo Central School of Commerce and Industry. Around 1918 he learnt the art of woodblock printing under Suwa Kanenori and exhibited at the Sosaku Hanga Kyokai (Creative Print Association) in 1922. His work appeared in magazines such as 'Minato' and its successor 'Kaze'.

He was a founding member of the Nippon Hanga Kyokai (Japan Print Association) in 1931. He worked for the Han magazine alongside Hiratsuka Un'ichi, Azechi Umetarō and Munakata Shikō. He contributed thirteen prints to the series Shin Tokyo Hyakkei ("One Hundred Views of New Tokyo") which was produced from 1928 to 1932. He took part in the painting events at the 1932 and 1936 Olympic Games. From 1936 he designed woodblock-printed covers for books.

Gallery

References

Further reading
 Smith, Lawrence, Modern Japanese Prints 1912-1989: Woodblocks and Stencils, BMP, London, 1994, p. 22 and no. 16.
 Merritt, Helen, and Yamada, Nanako, Guide to Modern Japanese Woodblock Prints 1900-1975, University of Hawaii Press, Honolulu, 1992, p. 21.
 Kamon, Yasuo, Tozaka, Koji, and Asahi, Akira, Shin Tokyo hyakkei, Heibonsha, Tokyo, 1978, pp. 80-2 (where his prints for One Hundred New Views of Tokyo are reproduced)
 Kato, Junzo (ed.), Kindai Nihon hanga taikei, II, Mainichi Shinbun, Tokyo, 1975, p. 277, and pls 106-9.
 Onchi, Koshiro, "The Modern Japanese Print: An Internal History of the Sosaku Hanga Movement", trans. U. Osamu and C. H. Mitchell in Ukiyo-e geijutsu, 11, 1965, p. 24.

1896 births
1947 deaths
20th-century Japanese painters
Japanese printmakers
Olympic competitors in art competitions
People from Niigata Prefecture